The 1970 Eastern Michigan Hurons football team represented Eastern Michigan University as an independent during the 1970 NCAA College Division football season. In their fourth season under head coach Dan Boisture, the Hurons compiled a 7–2–1 record and outscored their opponents, 237 to 109. On November 14, 1970, the Hurons won the final game of their season, 60–0, over Ball State, as running back Larry Ratcliff scored four touchdowns and rushed for 212 yards in his final college game.

Defensive tackle Dave Pureifory received second-team honors on the 1970 Little All-America college football team.

Schedule

References

Eastern Michigan
Eastern Michigan Eagles football seasons
Eastern Michigan Hurons football